Orocrambus sophistes is a moth in the family Crambidae. This species is endemic to New Zealand and has been observed in South Island at the Mackenzie Basin, Central Otago and Otago Lakes areas. This moth is a dryland specialist and inhabits short tussock grasslands. The larval host species is Festuca novae-zelandiae. The adults of this species have been observed from mid January to April with the female being flightless. The adult male is attracted to light. This species has been classified as Nationally Vulnerable by the Department of Conservation.

Taxonomy
This species was first described by Edward Meyrick in 1905 using a specimen collected by J. H. Lewis in Ida Valley, Otago. Meyrick named the species Crambus sophistes. In 1928, George Vernon Hudson also described and illustrated Crambus sophistes. In 1975, David E. Gaskin wrongly synonymised this species with Orocrambus cyclopicus. However, its transfer into the genus Orocrambus has been accepted. The type specimen is held at the Natural History Museum, London.

Description
Meyrick described the male of the species as follows:

The female of the species is flightless. Although this species resembles other endemic species in its genus, it can be distinguished by labial palps. It can be distinguished from O. cyclopicus as it is larger in size and its female is short winged.

Distribution
This species is endemic to New Zealand. The range of this species is the Mackenzie Basin, Central Otago and Otago Lakes. O. sophistes is possibly extinct in its type locality. This species has been collected at Devils Elbow at Coronet Peak.

Life cycle and behaviour
Adults have been observed from mid-January to April. The male of the species is attracted to light.

Habitat
O. sophistes is a dryland specialist and occurs in short tussock grasslands where its host plant is a common component.

Host species

O. sophistes is associated with the endemic grass Festuca novae-zelandiae.

Conservation status
This moth is classified under the New Zealand Threat Classification system as being Nationally Vulnerable. The reduction in the range of this species aligns with the contraction of range of its endemic host along with the fact that, as a result of the flightlessness of the female, this species has a limited ability to disburse.

References

External links
Image of female of species

Crambinae
Moths described in 1905
Moths of New Zealand
Endemic fauna of New Zealand
Taxa named by Edward Meyrick
Endangered biota of New Zealand
Endemic moths of New Zealand